The Greatest Beer Run Ever is a 2022 American biographical war comedy-drama film directed and co-written by Peter Farrelly, based on the book of the same name by John "Chickie" Donohue and Joanna Molloy. The film stars Zac Efron and Russell Crowe, and follows the true story of Donohue, who as a young veteran sneaks into the Vietnam War to deliver some beer to his friends, who are serving their duty.

The Greatest Beer Run Ever had its world premiere at the 2022 Toronto International Film Festival on September 13, 2022, and released in select US theaters on September 23 and on Apple TV+ on September 30, 2022, by Apple Studios. The film received mixed reviews from critics.

Plot 
In 1968, former Marine John “Chickie” Donohue is a slacking merchant seaman who lives with his family in Inwood, New York City, and likes to hang out at a bar operated by a somewhat cynical old man dubbed “The Colonel”. Chickie's sister Christine is strongly opposed to the Vietnam War in contrast to Chickie and their father, who also formerly served. Upon learning that an old friend, Johnny, is killed in action, Chickie and friends attend his funeral and are informed that another close friend, Tommy Minogue, whom Chickie persuaded to join the draft, has gone missing in action. After the funeral, Chickie and his friend Red find Christine in an anti-war demonstration and get into a brief physical altercation with some protestors. Back at the bar, Chickie and Red talk about how they could lift their serving friends' spirits. Chickie has an idea to go to South Vietnam himself and deliver his friends some beers. The next day, Chickie appears to backtrack on this, but as Tommy's mother suggests Chickie take to her son a set of rosary beads if he finds him, he sets out on the trip against Christine's warnings.

Chickie signs on to a ship sailing to Saigon with a duffle bag full of Pabst Blue Ribbon cans in search of military policeman Tommy Collins. He finds Collins, who is ecstatic to see him. That night, Collins' superior officer comes in and chastises Chickie for delivering the beers, then suspects him to be a CIA agent. Chickie and Collins' friends map out a plan for reaching Chickie's other friends, despite Collins urging Chickie to not put himself at risk in the battlefields and return to his ship. With guidance from a local named Hieu, Chickie stops at the Caravelle Hotel, where he finds American and British reporters opposed to the war. Using his CIA guise, he hitches a ride on a military caravan to Bien Hoa Air Base and is flown to Danang Air Base and then on to LZ Jane, where he searches for Rick Duggan, who is serving in the 1st Cavalry Division. Duggan’s sergeant radios him to report to the command post, forcing Duggan to run in plain sight under enemy fire. When Chickie surprises him, Duggan reacts angrily but allows Chickie to join him and his squad on the battlefield as they fire upon the Viet Cong from trenches. When night falls, Chickie again passes around beers. Duggan also tells Chickie that one of their friends, Reynolds, was killed. After parting ways with Duggan in the morning, Chickie is put on a chopper with two CIA agents who brutally interrogate and throw out a prisoner.

Landing at Kontum Airfield, Chickie requests a ride to Saigon, and one officer explains that he may leave his post to escort Chickie to Pleiku Air Base. When Chickie looks outside, he sees the officer driving a prison caravan. Realizing the agents are after him, he runs into the jungle, hiding until the agents give up the chase. Chickie walks alone and passes by a busted jeep and a child who runs away in fear with her mother. Later that night, after nearly being trampled by elephants running from napalm, Chickie is found by another old friend, Kevin “Looney” McLoone. Despite their orders to move in the opposite direction of where Chickie is headed, Chickie persuades McLoone and his men to drive him to Pleiku. McLoone puts Chickie on a chopper, and Chickie throws him his beer as the helicopter ascends.

Back in Saigon, Chickie learns that his ship has left early due to warnings of an impending attack and is on the way to the Philippines. Hieu gives Chickie directions to the U.S. Embassy, and he gives Hieu his address to visit him in New York. At the embassy, a woman helps him book a flight to Manila the next day in order to rejoin his ship. He returns to the Caravelle Hotel and shows the journalists photos as proof that he really went to LZ Jane. As the Viet Cong suddenly invades Saigon in the surprise Tet Offensive, Chickie and photographer Arthur Coates explore the streets, where Chickie sees Hieu killed in the Viet Cong attack on US Embassy. Chickie sees an armored car blow a hole in the embassy wall. The next morning, Coates photographs the aftermath of the embassy attack and witnesses a huge explosion in the distance. The two drive to the scene of the explosion at Long Binh Post, where Coates explains that the military would rather fake an entry hole in the embassy wall than admit that the attack was an inside job. At Long Binh, Chickie looks for and shares a beer with one last wounded friend, Bobby Pappas, who confirms Tommy Minogue's death.

Chickie returns home with a changed perspective on the war. Before drinking with his friends, he visits Mrs. Minogue to give her the rosary beads he was to give to Tommy. Chickie takes responsibility for talking Tommy into enlisting and his ultimate death, but Mrs. Minogue forgives him with a hug. In the park, he sits among the tributes for soldiers and shares his last beer with Christine.

The epilogue reveals that Collins, Duggan, McLoone, and Pappas all survived the war and returned home safely while Chickie went on to have a long career with the New York City sandhoggers union. The film ends with a modern day photograph of the group gathered for drinks.

Cast

Production
In 2015, Andrew Muscato produced and directed a short documentary The Greatest Beer Run Ever. The short was released on the Pabst Blue Ribbon YouTube Channel on Veterans Day November 11, 2015. The documentary was based on the true story of John "Chickie" Donohue who sailed to Vietnam to deliver beers to friends from the old neighborhood. He later said that he "was a staunch supporter of the war. But when I got there, I saw things that just weren't right, and it was just false, totally false."

On April 26, 2019, as soon as Skydance Media picked up the rights to adapt the book The Greatest Beer Run Ever to film, Peter Farrelly came on board to write the script with Brian Currie and Pete Jones as well as direct the movie. David Ellison, Dana Goldberg and Don Granger would produce for Skydance along with Andrew Muscato. Viggo Mortensen was cast in the film, with Dylan O'Brien joining him soon after.

In March 2021, the film was picked up by Apple Studios, with Mortensen and O'Brien no longer involved. Zac Efron and Russell Crowe entered negotiations to join the cast to replace O'Brien and Mortensen with Bill Murray courted for a supporting role. Efron and Crowe were confirmed to join the cast in July 2021. Filming was expected at the time to begin in August 2021, either in Australia or New Zealand. Jake Picking, Will Ropp, Archie Renaux and Kyle Allen were cast in September 2021. Murray would be confirmed in October, with Ruby Ashbourne Serkis, Matt Cook, Omari K. Chancellor and Will Hochman joining the next month.

Filming began in September 2021, and was shot on location in both Thailand and New Jersey.

Release
The Greatest Beer Run Ever had its world premiere at the 2022 Toronto International Film Festival on September 13, 2022, and was released in the United States by Apple Studios in select theaters on September 23, 2022, and on Apple TV+ on September 30, 2022.

Reception
On the review aggregator website Rotten Tomatoes, the film holds an approval rating of 43% based on 118 reviews. The site's critics consensus reads, "Far from intoxicating, The Greatest Beer Run Ever reduces its fun fact-based story to a flat, flavorless brew." Metacritic assigned the film a weighted average score of 39 out of 100 based on 30 critics, indicating "generally unfavorable reviews". In its first week of release, The Greatest Beer Run Ever was the tenth most popular TV show or movie on streaming in the United States.

Former United States Secretary of State, and Vietnam War veteran John Kerry wrote an Op-Ed for The Boston Globe in support of the film. In the op-ed, which was published on September 22, 2022, Mr. Kerry wrote, "For those of us of the Vietnam generation, the film is a poignant reminder that, whatever we did in that time and whatever our political perspective, how we experienced Vietnam is inextricably intertwined with who we experienced it with."

See also 
List of biographical films

References

External links
 The Greatest Beer Run Ever on Apple TV+
 

2022 films
2022 action comedy films
2022 comedy-drama films
2020s action comedy-drama films
2020s American films
2020s English-language films
American action comedy-drama films
American war comedy-drama films
Apple TV+ original films
Films about beer
Films based on memoirs
Films directed by Peter Farrelly
Films set in 1967
Films set in Manhattan
Films set in Saigon
Films shot in New Jersey
Films shot in Thailand
Films with screenplays by Peter Farrelly
Skydance Media films
Vietnam War films